{{Volleyball club infobox
|clubname = Quint Air Force 
 | color1        = white
 | color2        = #032480
|nickname = The Blue Eagles 
|image = Air Force Volleyball Club.png
|imagesize = 
|fullname = Air Force Women's Volleyball Clubb 
|founded = , as Bangkok Glass, as Air Force|dissolved = 2019
|ground = Chandrubeksa Stadium  Don Mueang District, Bangkok, Thailand
|capacity = 4,000
|colors = 
|chairman =  Suppakorn Jitreekan
|manager =  Padejsuk Wannachote
| mgrtitle = Head coach
|league = Thailand League
|season = 2018-19
|position = 5th place
|website = https://www.facebook.com/AirForceVC/
|pattern_b1=
|body1=042373
|pattern_la1=
|leftarm1=042373
|pattern_ra1=
|rightarm1=042373
|pattern_sh1=
|shorts1=000000
|pattern_so1=
|socks1=FFFFFF
|pattern_b2=
|body2=287e5b
|pattern_la2=
|leftarm2=287e5b
|pattern_ra2=
|rightarm2=287e5b
|pattern_sh2=
|shorts2=000000
|pattern_so2=
|socks2=FFFFFF
|titles= 
Asian Champion

Thailand League Champion
16px
Super League Champion
16px
}}

Air Force Women's Volleyball Club was a Thai professional volleyball club based in Don Mueang District, Bangkok and had been managed by Air Force Volleyball Club Co.,Ltd which was a subsidiary of Royal Thai Air Force.

The club had played at the top level of Thai volleyball for the majority of their existence and competed in the Thailand League. The club was founded in 2014 as BG VC (Bangkok Glass Volleyball Club) before reformed into Air Force WVC in 2018. Their home stadium was Chandrubeksa Stadium which has a capacity of 4,000.

History
As Bangkok Glass (2014–2018)
The club was founded in 2014, and had been managed by BGFC Sport Company Limited,.

The first tournament the club participated in Pro Challenge, 2014 (Division 1) in July 2014.
With an outstanding performances, BGVC wins the championship granting them a promotion to the highest level of competition;
the Volleyball Thailand League 2014–2015. The accomplishment can be evidently observed with the initial success which BGVC will keep on
triumphing through the years to come.

As Air Force (2018–2019)
The club transferred the right to compete in the Thailand League to Proflex Women's Volleyball Club in 2019.

Crest
The club logo incorporated elements from their mascot and nickname; The Blue Eagle.

2018–2019 squad

Honors
Domestic competitions
League
 Thailand League 
  Champion (2): 2014–15, 2015–16, as Bangkok Glass  Runner-up (2): 2016–17, as Bangkok Glass  Third place (1): 2017–18, as Bangkok Glass Super League
  Champion (2): 2015, 2016, as Bangkok Glass  Runner-up (2): 2017, 2018, as Bangkok Glass Pro Challenge 
  Champion (1): 2014, as Bangkok GlassCup
 Kor Royal Cup
  Runner-up (2): 2016, 2017, as Bangkok Glass BYouth League
 Academy U18 League
  Third place (2): 2015,2016, as Bangkok Glass U18''

Previous names
 2018–2019: Quint Air Force

References

 
2018 establishments in Thailand
Volleyball clubs in Thailand
Women's volleyball teams
Volleyball clubs established in 2018
2019 disestablishments in Thailand
Volleyball clubs disestablished in 2019